Gilles Emile Meloche (born July 12, 1950) is a Canadian professional ice hockey coach, scout and former player. Meloche played as a goaltender  in the National Hockey League (NHL) for the Chicago Black Hawks, California Golden Seals, Cleveland Barons, Minnesota North Stars and Pittsburgh Penguins. He is currently a special assignment scout for the Pittsburgh Penguins. Until 2013 he was the team's longtime goaltending coach, during which time the team won three Stanley Cups. Meloche was born in Montreal, Quebec.

Playing career
After playing junior hockey with the Verdun Maple Leafs, and loaned to the Quebec Remparts at the 1970 Memorial Cup, Meloche was the 70th selection in the 1970 amateur draft, chosen by the Chicago Black Hawks. His first professional season was spent mostly with the Flint Generals in the International Hockey League, with a two-game stint with Chicago. The Black Hawks were strong in goal with Tony Esposito, so Meloche was dealt to the California Golden Seals, one of the weakest teams in the league. In his first season with the Seals in 1971–72, he recorded a strong goals-against average of 3.33 and four shutouts, including one against the Boston Bruins, then a league powerhouse. The Seals' fortunes continued to worsen but Meloche continued to play well as the club's number one goaltender. He faced a barrage of rubber for another four seasons, including the Seals' relocation as the Cleveland Barons. For the next two seasons, Meloche solidly backstopped the Barons, with only a slight improvement in the team.

Following the Barons' merger with the Minnesota North Stars in 1978, Meloche was Minnesota's primary goalie and experienced his greatest success there. He spent eight seasons with the North Stars and appeared in the NHL All-Star game in 1980 and 1982. Minnesota experienced success in the playoffs as well, with an appearance in the Stanley Cup Finals in 1981 and the semi-finals in 1980 and 1984.

Despite leading the North Stars with 32 starts in the 1984-85 season, the 34-year old Meloche was getting a significant push from fellow netminders Don Beaupre and Roland Melanson, who was acquired from the New York Islanders during the season. With his contract up and two much younger netminders under contract, Meloche's rights were traded to the Edmonton Oilers.  With Grant Fuhr and Andy Moog firmly entrenched in the Oilers' net, the trade was an odd fit and not surprisingly, Meloche was on the move again without ever playing a game for Edmonton. Prior to the 1985-86 season the Oilers sent Meloche to Pittsburgh in the deal that landed Marty McSorley in Edmonton.

Meloche spent his final three seasons as the Penguins' starting goalie before retiring following the 1987–88 season.

In total, Meloche played in 788 NHL regular season games over nineteen seasons with a GAA of 3.64 and 20 shutouts. Largely because of his stint with the dreadful Seals and Barons, he ranks fourth on the list of goalies with most losses with 351, only behind Martin Brodeur, Curtis Joseph and Gump Worsley. He appeared in 45 playoff games and registered a GAA of 3.48 with 2 shutouts.

Following his retirement from playing, Meloche served as a Penguins scout from 1989 to 2006 and also served as a goaltending coach/consultant during much of that time. He was on the staff when the Penguins won Stanley Cups in 1991, 1992 and 2009. Meloche and his wife, Sophie, reside in Pittsburgh. His son, Eric, is a professional ice hockey player who played 74 NHL games between 2000 and 2007 for the Pittsburgh Penguins and Philadelphia Flyers.

Career statistics

Regular season and playoffs

International

References

External links 

1950 births
California Golden Seals players
Canadian ice hockey coaches
Canadian ice hockey goaltenders
Chicago Blackhawks draft picks
Chicago Blackhawks players
Cleveland Barons (NHL) players
Flint Generals (IHL) players
Ice hockey people from Montreal
Living people
Minnesota North Stars players
Pittsburgh Penguins coaches
Pittsburgh Penguins players
Pittsburgh Penguins scouts
Quebec Remparts players
Stanley Cup champions
Verdun Maple Leafs (ice hockey) players